The 2012–13 Surinamese Hoofdklasse was the 80th season of the SVB Hoofdklasse, the highest football league competition of Suriname. The season began in October 2012, and finished in June 2013.

League table

Regular season stage

References 

SVB Eerste Divisie seasons
1
Surinam